Devil's venom was a nickname coined by Soviet rocket scientists for a liquid rocket fuel composed of a dangerous combination of red fuming nitric acid and hydrazine—specifically, hypergolic UDMH-nitric acid. Both propellants are extremely dangerous individually: Nitric acid is highly corrosive and causes offgassing of toxic nitrogen dioxide during reactions, or even simply while exposed to air in its highly concentrated "red fuming" form used as rocket propellant. UDMH is both toxic and corrosive. Despite these dangers, the pairing has been used in rocketry because this combination of fuel and oxidizer is hypergolic (it does not require an external ignition source), which makes rockets using these materials simpler. Further, both the fuel and oxidizer have high boiling points compared to other rocket fuels (such as liquid hydrogen) and oxidizers (such as liquid oxygen), allowing rockets to be stored ready for launch for long periods without the fuel or oxidizer boiling off and needing to be replenished.

See also
Nedelin catastrophe

References 

Steven Zaloga (2002). The Kremlin's Nuclear Sword: The Rise and Fall of Russia's Strategic Nuclear Forces, 1945-2000, Smithsonian Institution Press, 

Space program of the Soviet Union
Rocket propellants
Soviet inventions